Robert Daniel Chibuzo Okonkwo (born 1975 in Lansing) played  professional basketball in England with the Plymouth Raiders. He represented also the Nigerian national team in the 1998 FIBA World Championship. A  Shooting guard, Okonkwo graduated from Yale University and signed a professional contract with the Raiders in 1997, where he played for two years before leaving to play for As Sadaka in Lebanon in 1999. Nigeria finished 13th in the 1998 World Championship.

Yale records and awards
157  career steals, 1st overall
54   single season steals, 1st overall
683  rebounds, 7th overall
17th Yale men's basketball player to score over 1,000 career points.

He was awarded the following while an undergraduate:
William Neely Mallory Award 1997, the most prestigious athletic honor given to a senior male at Yale;
Dutch Arnold Award 1997 and 1996, most valuable player
George McReynolds Award 1995, top defensive player
John C. Cobb Award 1994, top freshmen player.

See also
Plymouth Raiders

References

1975 births
Living people
Sportspeople from Lansing, Michigan
Basketball players from Michigan
American sportspeople of Nigerian descent
Yale Bulldogs men's basketball players
Nigerian men's basketball players
Plymouth Raiders players
1998 FIBA World Championship players
Shooting guards
American expatriate sportspeople in England
Nigerian expatriate sportspeople in England
American expatriate basketball people in the United Kingdom
Nigerian expatriate basketball people in the United Kingdom
American expatriate basketball people in Lebanon
Nigerian expatriate basketball people in Lebanon
American men's basketball players